The Argentina men's national squash team represents the Argentina in international squash team competitions, and is governed by Argentina Squash Rackets Association.

Current team
 Leandro Romiglio
 Robertino Pezzota
 Juan Pablo Roude
 Rodrigo Obregón

Results

World Team Squash Championships

See also 
 Argentina Squash Rackets Association
 World Team Squash Championships

References 

Squash teams
Men's national squash teams
Squash
Men's sport in Argentina